Acacia ammophila is a tree or shrub belonging to the genus Acacia. It is native to Queensland.

Description 
Acacia ammophila is a tree growing to 6 m. Its dark grey bark is furrowed. The phyllodes are linear and 10–20 cm long by 2.5–6 mm wide and acute  with a dense silvery appressed covering which is sparse on the older phyllodes. There are numerous closely parallel obscure nerves. The inflorescences consist of 2–4-headed racemes with the raceme axes being 1–4 mm long and also covered in dense hairs, on hairy peduncles which are 7–12 mm long. The golden heads are globular with 25–40 flowers and are 5 mm in diameter. The flowers consist of five parts. The pods are straight and up to 20 cm long by 4–8 mm wide. The oblong , dull, dark seeds are longitudinal with a minute aril.

Distribution 
It has been found only in southern inland Queensland, from near Adavale and near Thargomindah on the slopes of red sand dunes and on alluvial soils in open shrubland.

Taxonomy
It was first described by Leslie Pedley in 1978.

Conservation status
It has been listed as "vulnerable" under Australian environmental protection laws.

See also 
List of Acacia species

References

ammophila
Flora of Queensland
Plants described in 1978
Taxa named by Leslie Pedley